Mikes is a surname. Notable persons with the surname include:

 Christos Mikes (born 1971), retired Greek footballer
 Éva Mikes (1938-1986), Hungarian pop singer
 George Mikes (1912–1987), Hungarian-born British author
 Kelemen Mikes (1690–1761), Hungarian political figure
 Mihály Mikes (politician) (died 1662), Chancellor of Transylvania from 1656 to 1660
 Mihály Mikes (soldier) (died 1721), Hungarian landowner and aristocrat
 Mike Mikes, American soccer player

See also
Mikes family

Hungarian-language surnames